Roughing It is a book of semi-autobiographical travel literature by Mark Twain. It was written in 1870–71 and published in 1872, as a prequel to his first travel book The Innocents Abroad (1869). Roughing It is dedicated to Twain's mining companion Calvin H. Higbie, later a civil engineer who died in 1914.

The book follows the travels of young Mark Twain through the American West during the years 1861–1867. After a brief stint as a Confederate cavalry militiaman (not included in the account), he joined his brother Orion Clemens, who had been appointed Secretary of the Nevada Territory, on a stagecoach journey west.  Twain consulted his brother's diary to refresh his memory and borrowed heavily from his active imagination for many stories in the book.

Roughing It illustrates many of Twain's early adventures, including a visit to Salt Lake City, gold and silver prospecting, real-estate speculation, a journey to the Kingdom of Hawaii, and his beginnings as a writer. This memoir provides examples of Twain's rough-hewn humor, which would become a staple of his writing in such later books as Adventures of Huckleberry Finn (1884), The Adventures of Tom Sawyer (1876), and A Connecticut Yankee in King Arthur's Court (1889).

In popular culture
U.S. astronauts Frank Borman and Jim Lovell read Roughing It aloud to pass the time aboard NASA's Gemini VII, a 14-day-long Earth orbital mission in December 1965.

In Lords of St. Thomas, a 2018 historical novel set in St. Thomas, Nevada, the main character "Little" Henry Lord is reading Roughing It when he learns that his father has fallen from the Hoover Dam.

Adaptations
Various sections of Roughing It were borrowed by television series such as Bonanza. In 1960, an hour-long adaptation was broadcast on NBC starring Andrew Prine and James Daly.

A four-hour 2002 mini-series adaptation was broadcast on Hallmark Channel. Directed by Charles Martin Smith, it starred James Garner as an elderly Samuel Clemens and Robin Dunne as a young Clemens.

Roughing It recounts midway through the book that a rich "blind lead" gold strike was discovered and claimed by a partnership of Twain, Calvin Higbie, and a mine foreman A.D. Allen, giving them well-founded hopes of being millionaires.  To establish a claim, it was required that any or all of the claimants do a reasonable amount of work on the claimed strike within ten days.  Due to chance happenings and failed communications between the three, the work requirement was left unfulfilled, and the forfeited but rich claim was quickly seized by others ten days after it was discovered.  In the dedication of the book, Twain refers to Higbie as an "Honest Man, a Genial Comrade, and a Steadfast Friend … dedicated in Memory of the Curious Time When We Two Were Millionaires for Ten Days". The prospecting story is also covered in a 1968 episode of the  syndicated television anthology series Death Valley Days, hosted by Robert Taylor. In the television dramatization, Tom Skerritt plays Twain, and Dabney Coleman was cast as Higbie.

Notes

External links

 
 
 
  Text plus additional background material.
 

1872 books
Books by Mark Twain
Latter Day Saints in popular culture
American travel books
American frontier
American autobiographies